An IUCN Red List Critically Endangered (CR or sometimes CE) species is one that has been categorized by the International Union for Conservation of Nature as facing an extremely high risk of extinction in the wild. As of 2021, of the 120,372 species currently tracked by the IUCN, there are 8,404 species that are considered to be Critically Endangered. 

The IUCN Red List provides the public with information regarding the conservation status of animal, fungi, and plant species. It divides various species into seven different categories of conservation that are based on habitat range, population size, habitat, threats, etc. Each category representing a different level of global extinction risk. Species that are considered to be Critically Endangered are placed within the "threatened" category.

As the IUCN Red List does not consider a species extinct until extensive, targeted surveys have been conducted, species that are possibly extinct are still listed as Critically Endangered. IUCN maintains a list of "possibly extinct" and "possibly extinct in the wild" species, modelled on categories used by BirdLife International to categorize these taxa.

Criteria 
To be defined as Critically Endangered in the Red List, a species must meet any of the following criteria (A–E) ("3G/10Y" signifies three generations or ten years—whichever is longer—over a maximum of 100 years; "MI" signifies Mature Individuals):

A: Population Size Reduction
 The rate of reduction is measured either over a 10 year span or across three different generations within that species. 
 The cause for this decline must also be known.
 If the reasons for population reduction no longer occur and can be reversed, the population needs to have been reduced by at least 90%
 If not, then the population needs to have been reduced by at least 80%

B: Reduction Across a Geographic Range
 This reduction must occur over less than 100 km2 OR the area of occupancy is less than 10 km2.
 Severe habitat fragmentation or existing at just one location
 Decline in extent of occurrence, area of occupancy, area/extent/quality of habitat, number of locations/subpopulations, or amount of MI.
 Extreme fluctuations in extent of occurrence, area of occupancy, number of locations/subpopulations, or amount of MI.

C: Population Decline
 The population must decline to less than 250 MI and either:
 A decline of 25% over 3G/10Y
 Extreme fluctuations, or over 90% of MI in a single subpopulation, or no more than 50 MI in any one subpopulation.

D: Population Size Reduction
 The population size must be reduced to numbers of less than 50 MI.

E: Probability of Extinction
 There must be at least a 50% probability of going extinct in the wild within over 3G/10Y

Causes

The current extinction crisis is witnessing extinction rates that are occurring at a faster rate than that of the natural extinction rate. It has largely been credited towards human impacts on climate change and the loss of biodiversity. This is along with natural forces that may create stress on the species or cause an animal population to become extinct. 

Currently the biggest reason for species extinction is human interaction that results in habitat loss. Species rely on their habitat for the resources needed for their survival. If the habitat becomes destroyed, the population will see a decline in their numbers. Activities that cause loss of habitat include pollution, urbanization, and agriculture. Another reason for plants and animals to become endangered is due to the introduction of invasive species. Invasive species invade and exploit a new habitat for its natural resources as a method to outcompete the native organisms, eventually taking over the habitat. This can lead to either the native species' extinction or causing them to become endangered, which also eventually causes extinction. Plants and animals may also go extinct due to disease. The introduction of a disease into a new habitat can cause it to spread amongst the native species. Due to their lack of familiarity with the disease or little resistance, the native species can die off.

References

IUCN Red List
Biota by conservation status.